Alec Briggs (born 21 June 1939) is an English former professional footballer born in Sheffield who played for Bristol City between 1957 and 1970. He made 351 appearances in the Football League, scoring once.

References

1939 births
Living people
Footballers from Sheffield
Association football central defenders
English Football League players
English footballers
Bristol City F.C. players